Cabral may refer to:

Places
Amílcar Cabral International Airport, international airport of Cape Verde
Cabral, Dominican Republic, a town in the Dominican Republic
Cabrales, municipality in Spain
Fundação Dom Cabral, Brazilian business school
Robert J. Cabral Station, United States train station
Sargento Cabral Department, in Chaco Province in Argentina
Vila Olímpica Elzir Cabral, multi-use stadium in Brazil

Other
Pedro Álvares Cabral,  Portuguese explorer, the European discoverer of Brazil
African Youth Amílcar Cabral, youth wing of PAIGC political party in Guinea-Bissau
Amílcar Cabral Cup, football tournament for Western African nations
Cabral (horse), a Paralympics dressage horse
Cabral (surname)
Cabrales cheese, Spanish cheese
Fenyramidol, trade name Cabral, a muscle relaxant
Cabral Ibacka, Romanian-Congolese TV personality
Cabral (footballer) (born 1988), Cape Verdean footballer

See also 
Cabreira, a comarca (shire) in the province of León, Spain
 Cabrera (disambiguation)
 Cabrero (disambiguation)